Dedham High School is a public high school in Dedham, Massachusetts, United States, and a part of the Dedham Public Schools district. The school was founded in 1851 by the oldest public school system in the country. It earned a silver medal from U.S. News & World Report in 2017, ranked as the 48th best high school in Massachusetts.

In the 2010s the school saw growth in both the number of students taking Advanced Placement courses and in qualifying scores on the exams. It ranks in the top 10 of Massachusetts high schools with 26.6 percent of students taking at least one AP exam during the 2015-16 school year. The school's athletic program offers 26 varsity sports with a mascot known as the Marauder, and 26 co-curricular clubs and activities. Each student receives a personal computer from the school.

History

1800s
As early as 1827, the Commonwealth of Massachusetts required all towns with more than 500 families to establish a free public high school. Beginning in 1844 the School Committee repeatedly began recommending that the town establish a high school. It was not until 1850 when, under threat of a lawsuit, that the town meeting voted to "instruct the Town's School Committee to hire a building and teacher, and establish a High School according to law." A sum of $3,000 was appropriated to support it.

The new school was opened on September 15, 1851 with 42 students. Charles J. Capen, a private high school teacher, was hired to teach at the new school, and his classroom in the Masonic Hall above William Field's dry good store was rented by the town. The building, located at 25 Church Street, was previously Miss Emily Hodge's Private School. The school used this space from 1851 to 1854, at which point it was moved to the Town House on Bullard Street.

In 1894, the alumni association presented the school with a gift of 350 books as the nuculeus of the Slafter Reference Library, named in honor of principal Carlos Slafter. The books were chosen from a selection of American and English authors as well as many standard reference books. The school committee purchased a special oak book case for the collection and placed a silver plate upon it stating:

Slafter Reference Library
Dedham High School
Formed in grateful recognition of the service of
Carlos Slafter
Principal of the High School 1852-1892
Given by the Alumni Association November 27, 1894

1900s
In 1958, the student council adopted a dress code at the school. By 1973, much of the code had been eliminated, including skirts for girls and neckties for boys, but there remained a ban on blue jeans; jeans of other colors were allowed. A student protest on February 15, 1973, which included a walkout of classes and became known as "Dungaree Day," led to a repeal of the ban.

The population of the school peaked in 1972 with more than 2,100 students in grades 9-12, but declined in the following years. The then-middle school (housed in the 1915 High School building), however, was at capacity, and so from 1996 until the new middle school opened in 2007, Dedham High School served grades 8-12.

Buildings

After moving from Masonic Hall, the classes were held at the Town House for one year until, in 1855, a new school was built on Highland Street and dedicated on December 10. A new school was built on Bryant Street in 1887, and students moved in on October 3. That building was 80' long and 77' wide. After 1915, when the high school moved to Whiting Avenue, the building housed the Ames Junior High School, and today it is the site of the Dedham Town Hall.

From 1916 to 1959 the high school was located at 70 Whiting Avenue. Governor Calvin Coolidge took part in the dedication ceremony on March 31, 1917. Students first occupied the school in the spring of 1916. It was three stories tall, plus a basement, and was built of water-struck brick and featured terra cotta trimming. It later served as the Dedham Middle School.

In 1932 a new wing was added at a cost of $200,000. It contained an auditorium dedicated to George Frederick Joyce, who was connected to the school for 25 years and principal for 21 of them, on May 12, 1933. Later, this wing was used as the Oakdale Junior High School.

Special laws were passed by the Massachusetts General Court in 1957 allowing the town to use Stone Park across the street to build a new high school. Classes began at 140 Whiting Avenue in 1959, and continue to the present. An addition to this building was constructed in 1967, which consisted of a new academic wing and an additional gymnasium. In 1976 a new library, a larger cafeteria, modern science laboratories, swimming pool, and more classrooms were added. The old cafeteria was converted into an auto body shop, and is currently the home of the town's Facilities Department.

The library was renovated and expanded in 1999, and the C-Wing of the school was renovated with state-of-the-art new science labs in 2002. The superintendent and other central administrators have offices in renovated classrooms in the B-wing, and the town's Youth Commission has offices in the A-wing.

Principals
There have been 18 principals of Dedham High School, a position currently held by James Forrest. The longest serving was Carlos Slafter, who served for 40 years, and who hired his own daughter as a teacher. Peter Smith served twice, from 1976-1987 and from 1997-2000.

Academics
The approximately 60 teachers at the school serve 734 students, giving the school a student to teacher ratio of 11.3:1.

MCAS
Between 2006 and 2013, scores on the Massachusetts Comprehensive Assessment System improved 20%. In 2012, 91% of students scored proficient or higher on the English Language Arts portion. For the math and science portions, the numbers were 89% and 79%, respectively, both of which were at least 10% higher than the state as a whole. In the biology subject exam, Dedham High School has ranked as one of the best in the state, with three students earning perfect scores.

College courses
Students taking some honors or AP courses can dual-enroll for college credit at the nearby Massachusetts Bay Community College. The three credits can then be transferred to another state college or some private colleges, allowing students to place out of those classes in college. Courses eligible for dual enrollment include English 4, calculus, pre-calculus, world and U.S. history, psychology, biology, chemistry, anatomy and physiology, and environmental earth science.

Mass Math + Science Initiative 
More than 260 sophomores, juniors, and seniors, which amounts to nearly half of those classes, are taking at least one Advanced Placement course. In 2009 the school joined the Mass Math + Science Initiative, a program sponsored by Mass Insight Education, and by 2012 the number of students who have scored a qualifying score on the exam had risen by 57%. By 2013, the number of qualifying scores had risen 68% to 141. During the 2015-16 school year, 26.6 percent of students took at least one AP exam.

Technology
The town of Dedham has made a substantial commitment to making sure every student has access to the latest educational technology. Beginning in 2011, each incoming freshman was provided with a new netbook computer to use in class and take home at night. While the computers remain the property of the school district, students are responsible for them. As the district has a policy of replacing computers every five years, and since one of the machines would be nearly depreciated by the time a student is graduated four years later, the district allows students to keep the computers after commencement.

The original plan was to provide each new freshman with a netbook until, four years later, the entire school would be outfitted with them. In the 2012-2013 school year freshmen were given netbooks, while sophomores received iPads. The schedule was accelerated beginning with the 2013-2014 school year, when freshmen received netbooks while all sophomores, juniors, and seniors received iPads. Eventually all students will be issued iPads.

Parents are asked to pay a $100 technology fee to help cover the cost of the equipment. However, for students who receive free or reduced price lunch, the fee is waived. The program may be extended in future years to include middle school students as well.

Athletics

Sports
Dedham High School participates in the Tri-Valley League (TVL) of the Massachusetts Interscholastic Athletic Association. Dedham High School joined the TVL for the 2017-18 school year, leaving behind the Bay State Conference after 58 years of membership. They were previously invited to join in 2009, but declined the offer. Dedham's enrollment had shrunk to 719 during the 2015-16 school year, when the move was announced, nearly one-third the size of some larger schools in the Bay State Conference, such as Newton North, Framingham, and Weymouth.

Fall
 Cheerleading 
 Boys' cross country 
 Girls' cross country
 Field hockey 
 Football 
 Golf 
 Boys' soccer 
 Girls' soccer 
 Volleyball 
Winter
 Boys' basketball 
 Girls' basketball 
 Cheerleading
 Boys' ice hockey 
 Girls' ice hockey 
 Boys' indoor track 
 Girls' indoor track 
 Swimming
 Wrestling
Spring
 Baseball 
 Boys' lacrosse 
 Girls' lacrosse 
 Boys' outdoor track 
 Girls' outdoor track 
 Softball 
 Boys' tennis
 Girls' tennis

Championships
Dedham has had some sports success such as a D3 Wrestling state title in 2018. The girls field hockey won several Tri Valley League and Bay State League titles in the 2000s, and also a state championship in 2003. Dedham football also went undefeated in the regular season in 1988 with a 10-0 record.

In 2022, both the boys and girls varsity soccer teams played, but lost, in the state championships.

Thanksgiving Day football rivalry
Dedham High School began playing Norwood High School in an annual football contest in 1920. Over the years, there have been several notable incidents. In 1946, thousands of fans swarmed the field for about 20 minutes after a Norwood touchdown pass was brought back on an offensive interfernce penalty. During the closing minutes of the game, the crowd threw stones and other objects at the officials. The Dedham Police Department had to escort them off the field after the game.

In 1956, seven boys from Norwood High School threw bottles of blue and white paint, the school colors, through the windows of Dedham's School Department administration building to celebrate their team's win the day before. While they admitted to the paint, they denied being involved with the smashing of 22 windows at Dedham High School on Thanksgiving Day.

Mascot
As the town of Dedham is the seat of Norfolk County, the school's athletic teams informally used the name "Shiretowners" until 1968. The name "Marauders" was officially adopted and an American Indian was chosen as the mascot. The name and the colors of crimson and gray were retained, but the logo changed to a pirate in 2007.

Stone Park
Most teams play at Veteran's Memorial Field at Stone Park, which was rededicated on Thanksgiving Day, 2011, following a major upgrade and renovation. The land where the stadium and school stand was originally donated by Col. Eliphalet Stone. Stone deeded 49,897 sq. ft of land to the Dedham Improvement Society, an unincorporated organization, on June 2, 1884, to be used as a park.

On January 2, 1895, Town Meeting took the property, per Stone's instructions, and purchased an adjoining parcel for from Louise M. Morse for $8,750, bringing the entire parcel up to 6.25 acres. It was later expanded again to 8.49 acres. Town Meeting appropriated $2,500 on September 16, 1895, and the land was graded and developed with a cinder track of .2 miles and a dressing house. The original land donated by Stone became a playground of 250' by 425'. In 1957, the Great and General Court of Massachusetts passed laws allowing the town to use the land to build a new high school.

Athletic directors
In recent years the school has seen a number of new athletic directors. Tom Arria left in 2010 to take a position at a bigger school in Nashua, New Hampshire. He was replaced by Michael Plansky, who left three years later to join a foundation with which he has family ties that assists veterans with addictions. Steve Traister, the current athletic director and director of health and physical education in the Milton public school system, took over for Plansky in 2013.

Co-curricular activities
Dedham High School currently offers 26 co-curricular activities:

 Art Club
 Chamber Singers
 Chess Club
 Color Guard
 Computer Club
 Debate Team
 Drama Club
 ECHO - literary magazine
 Fashion Club
 French Club
 Global Citizens
 Jazz Band
 Link Crew
 Marching Band
 The Mirror - student newspaper
 National Honor Society
 Math Team
 Peer Leaders
 String Ensemble
 Students Against Destructive Decisions
 Science Team
 Sexuality and Gender Alliance
 Student Council
 Winter Percussion
 Women Empowerment Club
 Youth and Government

Senior class play
The senior class at Dedham High School has a long tradition of putting on a play, usually a musical, as one of their final efforts as a class. Tryouts are usually held in December, and the production is staged in mid-March. While the play has been held annually since at least the late 1960s, the tradition is much older than that. Connie Hines, a member of the class of 1948, tried out for a role in her senior class play but did not make the cut. After graduation she went on to Hollywood and starred in a number of television shows, including Mr. Ed.

1980s
 1980 - Fiddler on the Roof
 1981 - WhatareyagonnadonowJim?
 1982 - South Pacific
 1983 - Oklahoma
 1984 - The Wizard of Oz
 1985 - Guys and Dolls
 1986 - Grease
 1987 - Chicago
 1988 - Peter Pan
 1989 - Little Shop of Horrors
1990s
 1990 - Leader of the Pack
 1991 - Man of La Mancha
 1992 - Oliver!
 1993 - Starmites
 1994 - The Wiz
 1995 - Hello, Dolly!
 1996 - Bye Bye Birdie
 1997 - Damn Yankees
 1998 - Zombie Prom
 1999 - Joseph and the Amazing Technicolor Dreamcoat
2000s
 2000 - Once Upon a Mattress
 2001 - Little Shop of Horrors
 2002 - Peter Pan
 2003 - My Fair Lady
 2004 - Big
 2005 - Bye Bye Birdie
 2006 - Beauty and the Beast
 2007 - Seussical
 2008 - Copacabana
 2009 - The Wiz
2010s
 2010 - Zombie Prom
 2011 - Bye Bye Birdie
 2012 - Anything Goes
 2013 - Footloose
 2014 - High School Musical
 2015 - Legally Blonde
 2016 - Cinderella
 2017 - Strange Case of Dr Jekyll and Mr Hyde
 2018 - The Wonderful Wizard of Oz
 2019 - Guys and Dolls
2020s
 2020 - Mama Mia (Did not open due to Covid-19)
 2021 - The Addams Family Musical
 2022 - Hairspray
 2023 - Cinderella (Beane musical)

Demographics

Notable alumni
 Elizabeth Campbell Fisher Clay, noted artist
 Leon A. Edney, former Supreme Allied Commander, NATO Atlantic Forces, United States Atlantic Command, Commodore Admiral, US Navy
 Charles A. Finn, oldest priest in the United States and son of the oldest resident of Dedham
Joseph R. Fisher (1921–1981), Marine Corps colonel, Navy Cross recipient
 Denise Garlick, Representative in the Massachusetts General Court, Class of 1972
 Connie Hines, actress, Class of 1948
 Maryanne Lewis, former Representative in the Massachusetts General Court
 Paul McMurtry, Representative in the Massachusetts General Court, Class of 1984 
 Betty Jo Nelsen, former member and minority leader of the Wisconsin State Assembly
 George F. Williams, U.S. Representative

Notes

References

Works cited

Public high schools in Massachusetts
Buildings and structures in Dedham, Massachusetts
Educational institutions established in 1851
Bay State Conference
Schools in Dedham, Massachusetts
1851 establishments in Massachusetts